Pityrodia ternifolia is a species of flowering plant in the mint family, Lamiaceae and is endemic to north-western Australia. It is an erect shrub with densely hairy stems, sticky and prickly, egg-shaped leaves, and  mauve or pinkish-red, tube-shaped flowers.

Description
Pityrodia ternifolia is an erect shrub that has its stems and branches densely covered with woolly, glandular hairs. The edges of the leaves are toothed and sometimes sharply pointed, and there are scattered glandular hairs on both surfaces. The flowers are arranged singly in leaf axils on a thin pedicel, usually shorter than the leaves and there are leaf-like bracts and linear or narrowly elliptic bracteoles at the base of the flowers.

Taxonomy
This species was first formally described in 1859 by Ferdinand von Mueller who gave it the name Dennisonia ternifolia in the Journal of the Proceedings of the Linnean Society, Botany. In 1979, Ahmad Abid Munir moved it to the genus Pityrodia as Pityrodia ternifolia in the Journal of the Adelaide Botanic Gardens. The specific epithet (ternifolia) means "three-leaved", referring to the whorled leaves.`

Distribution and habitat
This pityrodia grows in sandy soils on sandstone ridges and rocks in the Northern Kimberley, Victoria Bonaparte, Arnhem Coast, Arnhem Plateau, Darwin Coastal, Gulf Coastal, Gulf Fall and Uplands, Ord Victoria Plain and Pine Creek bioregions of the Northern Territory and Western Australia.

Conservation status
Pityrodia ternifolia is listed as of "least concern" under the Northern Territory Government Territory Parks and Wildlife Conservation Act and as "not threatened" by the Government of Western Australia Department of Biodiversity, Conservation and Attractions.

References

External links
 Pityrodia ternifolia: Occurrence data from the Australasian Virtual Herbarium

ternifolia
Plants described in 1859
Flora of Western Australia
Flora of the Northern Territory
Taxa named by Ferdinand von Mueller